René Gilsi (1905–2002) was a Swiss painter.

References
This article was initially translated from the German Wikipedia.

20th-century Swiss painters
Swiss male painters
1905 births
2002 deaths
20th-century Swiss male artists